The Palmer House is a historic home in Monticello, Florida. It is located at Palmer Mill Road and South Jefferson Street. On November 21, 1978, it was added to the U.S. National Register of Historic Places.

References

Gallery

Houses on the National Register of Historic Places in Florida
National Register of Historic Places in Jefferson County, Florida
Houses in Jefferson County, Florida
Monticello, Florida
1867 establishments in Florida